Ahmadabad Rural District may refer to:
 Ahmadabad Rural District (Nazarabad County), Alborz province
 Ahmadabad Rural District (Eqlid County), Fars province
 Ahmadabad Rural District (Firuzabad County), Fars province
 Ahmadabad Rural District (Takab County), West Azerbaijan province

See also
Ahmadabad-e Mostowfi Rural District